Southern River may refer to:
Southern River (Western Australia), a tributary of Canning River (Western Australia)
Southern River, Western Australia, a suburb of Perth, Western Australia